Rapelang Rabana is a computer scientist, entrepreneur, and keynote speaker. She is currently the Founder and Chair of Rekindle Learning, a learning technology company; and previously co-founded Yeigo Communications, South Africa's first free VoIP mobile services provider.

She has been featured on the cover of ForbesAfrica magazine, selected as a FastCompany Maverick, named Entrepreneur for the World by the World Entrepreneurship Forum and selected as a Young Global Leader by the World Economic Forum.

Early life and education
Rapelang was born in Gaborone, Botswana. She started her schooling in Gaborone before moving to Johannesburg and attended Roedean School. Rapelang graduated with honours from the University of Cape Town in 2005 with a bachelor's degree in Business Science with a specialty in Computer Science. Rapelang returned to the University of Cape Town to give a commencement speech in 2019.

Career
After graduating from university, Rabana co-created the VoIP mobile application called Yeigo in 2006. In 2009, Telfree, a South African next-generation operator, bought a majority stake in Yeigo. Rabana was appointed as the leader of Telfree's Research and Development department until she exited the business in 2012.

In 2014, Rabana founded Rekindle Learning, which empowers people to respond to the changing world of work through digital learning experiences. In November 2017, Rapelang was named Chief Digital Officer of BCX where she served until the end of 2018.

Achievements
In 2012, she was on Oprah Magazine's O Power List. In 2013, she was listed on Forbes's 30 under 30 list for best entrepreneurs of Africa. In 2014, Rapelang was named one of the Entrepreneurs of the World by the World Entrepreneurship Forum. In 2017, Rapelang was selected as a Young Global Leader of the World Economic Forum.

International organizations
Rapelang was invited to join the World Economic Forum 2012 Annual Meeting in Davos. She was also selected as a Global Shaper later a Young Global Leader by the World Economic Forum. She is an Ambassador and Juror for the United Nations World Summit Awards. Rapelang gave the keynote address at Gartner Symposium 2015 in Cape Town.

References

South African computer scientists
South African women computer scientists
University of Cape Town alumni
Alumni of Roedean School, South Africa
Living people
Year of birth missing (living people)